{{DISPLAYTITLE:C22H26O5}}
The molecular formula C22H26O5 may refer to:

 Calanolide A, an experimental non-nucleoside reverse transcriptase inhibitor
 Hydroxyestrone diacetate, a synthetic, steroidal estrogen